The 1880 United States presidential election in New Hampshire took place on November 2, 1880, as part of the 1880 United States presidential election. Voters chose five representatives, or electors to the Electoral College, who voted for president and vice president.

New Hampshire voted for the Republican nominee, James A. Garfield, over the Democratic nominee, Winfield Scott Hancock. Garfield won the state by a narrow margin of 4.70%. This would be the last occasion any Democratic presidential candidate won Grafton County until Woodrow Wilson in 1912, and the last occasion a Democrat won an absolute majority of the presidential vote in Grafton or Belknap Counties until Lyndon B. Johnson did so in his 1964 landslide.

Results

Results by county

See also
 United States presidential elections in New Hampshire

References

New Hampshire
1880
United States presidential